Sunja may refer to:
 Sunja, Sisak-Moslavina County, a village and municipality in Croatia
 Sunja (Sava), a river in Croatia
 Sunja River or Sunzha River, a river in Russia
 Sunja (name), a Korean female given name